For One Thousand Dollars Per Day (also known as Renegade Gunfighter) is a 1966 Italian-Spanish Spaghetti Western film directed by Silvio Amadio. The title song ""My Gun is Fast" is performed by Bobby Solo.

Cast 
 Zachary Hatcher: Hud Backer
 Mimmo Palmara: Sheriff Steven Benson
 Pier Angeli: Betty Benson
 Rubén Rojo: Jason Clark 
 Mirko Ellis: Wayne Clark 
 José Calvo: Carranza

References

External links

1966 films
Italian Western (genre) films
Films directed by Silvio Amadio
Spaghetti Western films
1966 Western (genre) films
Films shot in Almería
1960s Italian films